"Waiting Game" was the second single release from The Cooper Temple Clause's third album Make This Your Own and reached #41 in the UK singles chart. The CD version of Waiting Game included a U-MYX feature which allowed people to remix the track in their own personal way.

When the single charted it was the second week in UK chart history, in which all downloads count towards the chart regardless if there is a physical release or not. If the chart was still under the previous rules in which one was needed, the single would have made #36.

Track listing
CD single
"Waiting Game"
"Pulling Shapes"
"Waiting Game (U-MYX)"
"Waiting Game (Video)"

7"
"Waiting Game"
"Last Line of Defence"

Orange Vinyl 7"
"Waiting Game (Radio Edit)"
"For the Last Time"

Japanese EP
"Waiting Game"
"Last Line of Defence"
"Pulling Shapes"
"For the Last Time
"Waiting Game (Rhysmix)

2007 singles
The Cooper Temple Clause songs
2007 songs
Song articles with missing songwriters